Alex Pierzchalski (born August 7, 1991) is a former Canadian football wide receiver. He was drafted by the Saskatchewan Roughriders in the second round of the 2014 CFL Draft. He played Canadian Interuniversity Sport football at the University of Toronto and attended London South Collegiate Institute in London, Ontario.

College career
Pierzchalski played four seasons for the Toronto Varsity Blues, recording career totals of 149 receptions for 1,617 yards and 13 touchdowns in 32 games.

Professional career

Saskatchewan Roughriders
Pierzchalski was drafted by the Saskatchewan Roughriders with the eighteenth pick in the 2014 CFL Draft. He dressed in 13 regular season games and made four special teams tackles. He recorded his first career reception against the Calgary Stampeders on October 24, 2014. He played in both pre-season games for the Riders, recording five catches for 22 yards and a touchdown, before being among the team's final cuts on June 20, 2015. He was offered a practice roster spot by the Roughriders, but he declined in order to pursue opportunities elsewhere.

Ottawa Redblacks
Pierzchalski signed with the Ottawa Redblacks on June 22, 2015.

Montreal Alouettes
Pierzchalski played the 2017 season with Montreal. He retired after the season.

References

External links
Ottawa Redblacks profile 
Saskatchewan Roughriders profile
Toronto Varsity Blues profile

Living people
1991 births
Players of Canadian football from Ontario
Canadian football wide receivers
Ottawa Redblacks players
Montreal Alouettes players
Toronto Varsity Blues football players
Saskatchewan Roughriders players
Canadian football people from Toronto